The 2011 Nigerian Senate election in Gombe State was held on April 9, 2011, to elect members of the Nigerian Senate to represent Gombe State. Mohammed Danjuma Goje representing Gombe Central, Joshua Zidani representing Gombe South and Sa'idu Ahmed Alkali representing Gombe North all won on the platform of Peoples Democratic Party.

Overview

Summary

Results

Gombe Central 
Peoples Democratic Party candidate Mohammed Danjuma Goje won the election, defeating other party candidates.

Gombe South 
Peoples Democratic Party candidate Joshua Zidani won the election, defeating other party candidates.

Gombe North 
Peoples Democratic Party candidate Sa'idu Ahmed Alkali won the election, defeating party candidates.

References 

Gombe State senatorial elections
Gombe State senatorial elections
Gombe State Senate elections